TAP2 is a gene in humans that encodes the protein Antigen peptide transporter 2.

Function 

The membrane-associated protein encoded by this gene is a member of the superfamily of ATP-binding cassette (ABC) transporters.  ABC proteins transport various molecules across extra- and intra-cellular membranes.  ABC genes are divided into seven distinct subfamilies (ABC1, MDR/TAP, MRP, ALD, OABP, GCN20, White).  This protein is a member of the MDR/TAP subfamily.  Members of the MDR/TAP subfamily are involved in multidrug resistance.  This gene is located 7 kb telomeric to gene family member ABCB2 (TAP1).  The protein encoded by this gene is involved in antigen presentation.  This protein forms a heterodimer with ABCB2 in order to transport peptides from the cytoplasm to the endoplasmic reticulum.  Mutations in this gene may be associated with ankylosing spondylitis, insulin-dependent diabetes mellitus, schizophrenia, and celiac disease.  Alternative splicing of this gene produces two products which differ in peptide selectivity and level of restoration of surface expression of MHC class I molecules.

See also 
 ATP-binding cassette transporter

References

Further reading

External links 
 

ATP-binding cassette transporters